Lithocharis is a genus of rove beetles in the family Staphylinidae.

Species (list incomplete)

 Lithocharis alutacea Casey g
 Lithocharis fuscipennis Kraatz, 1859 g
 Lithocharis heres Blackwelder g
 Lithocharis nigriceps Kraatz, 1859 g
 Lithocharis ochracea Gravenhorst, 1802 i c g b
 Lithocharis quadricollis Casey g
 Lithocharis simplex Casey g
 Lithocharis sonorica Casey g
 Lithocharis thoracica (Casey, 1905) b
 Lithocharis tricolor b
 Lithocharis uvida Kraatz g
 Lithocharis vilis Kraatz, 1859 i c g
 Lithocharis volans Blackwelder g
 † Lithocharis scottii Scudder 1900 g
 † Lithocharis varicolor Heer 1856 g

Data sources: i = ITIS, c = Catalogue of Life, g = GBIF, b = Bugguide.net

References
Citations

Sources

Further reading

External links

 

Paederinae